Donald Frederic Shy (born November 15, 1945) is a former professional American football player who played running back for seven seasons for the Pittsburgh Steelers, the New Orleans Saints, the Chicago Bears, and the St. Louis Cardinals of the National Football League (NFL).

Prior to his pro career, he played football and ran track and field at San Diego State as well as Mt. San Antonio College.  He was inducted into the Mt. SAC Athletics Hall of Fame in 1993.  He ran his personal best 13.61 in the 120 yard hurdles while taking second place at the 1966 AAU National Championships ahead of future world record holder and NFL player Earl McCullouch.

References

1945 births
Living people
American football running backs
Chicago Bears players
New Orleans Saints players
Pittsburgh Steelers players
San Diego State Aztecs football players
Southern California Sun players
St. Louis Cardinals (football) players
Sportspeople from Pomona, California
Players of American football from California
Players of American football from Cleveland
San Diego State Aztecs men's track and field athletes